Guanshan Subdistrict is a subdistrict in Hongshan District, Wuhan, Hubei, China. To the east it borders the Donghu New Technology Development Zone; to the south it borders Jiangxia District and the Third Ring Road; to the west it borders Zhuodaoquan Subdistrict; to the north it borders the East Lake Nature Scenic Area. The subdistrict encompasses the campuses of more than ten universities including Huazhong University of Science and Technology, China University of Geosciences, South Central University for Nationalities, Zhongnan University of Economics and Law, and Wuhan Textile University.

History
Guanshan People's Commune (the forbearer of Guanshan Subdistrict) was established in August 1958.

In March 1961, Guanshan People's Commune and Hongshan District People's Commune were combined into Hongshan District.

From June 1963, Hongshan District included Guanshan Subdistrict.

In August 1964, Guanshan Subdistrict was transferred from Hongshan District to Wuchang District.

In July 1986, Guanshan Subdistrict was transferred from Wuchang District to Hongshan District.

In 2004, Moshan Residential Community was transferred from Guanshan Subdistrict to East Lake Scenic Area Subdistrict.

In November 2010, eight residential communities (Qilingjiusuo, Hongxing, Wujiawan, Huachengyuan, Luguang, Gongchengda, Guanxi, and Guanxi'er) were transferred into the newly-created Zhuodaoquan Subdistrict.

Administrative divisions
Guanshan Subdistrict administers twenty-eight residential communities:
Haihe, Nanwang, Youkeyuan (- FiberHome Technologies Group ), Hudian, Qibiao, Zhongnan Caijing Zhengfa Daxue Nanhu, Zisong, Minda (- South Central University for Nationalities), Fangda (- Wuhan Textile University), Guanshankou, Qifa, Yangguang, Yijinghuating, Guannan, Lumolu, Changjiang, Dida (- China University of Geosciences), Long'an, Kangjuyuan, Bishui, Geguang, Xuefu, Jianqiaochuntian, Baoli, Zhihuicheng, Fenglinshangcheng, Yangchun, Huazhong Keji Daxue (- Huazhong University of Science and Technology)

Demographics

After the creation of Zhuodaoquan Subdistrict in late 2010 and other changes, the total population and area of Guanshan Subdistrict was reduced. The population figures from the Fifth National Population Census of the People's Republic of China in 2000 and the Sixth National Population Census of the People's Republic of China in 2010 include areas that are no longer part of present-day Guanshan Subdistrict. In 2016, 1,905 babies were born in Guanshan Subdistrict with 99.21% of these births in compliance with the child planning policies of China.

Transportation
Guanshan Subdistrict is served by Optics Valley Square station on Line 2 (Wuhan Metro). The Third Ring Road forms the southern limit of Guanshan Subdistrict.

References

Subdistricts of the People's Republic of China
Township-level divisions of Hubei
Geography of Wuhan